Brian Deegan is the name of:
Brian Deegan (lawyer) (born 1955), South Australian political activist and former magistrate
Brian Deegan (motorcyclist) (born 1975), professional Freestyle Motocross rider and off-road racer